Zolkow may refer to:
Zölkow, a municipality in northern Germany
Żółków, Greater Poland Voivodeship, west-central Poland
Żółków, Subcarpathian Voivodeship, south-east Poland